Al-Sayyid Muhammad al-Hasan bin ‘Alawi bin ‘Abbas bin ‘Abd al-‘Aziz (1944–2004), also knowing as Muhammad ibn Alawi al-Maliki, was one of the foremost traditional Sunni Islamic scholar of contemporary times from Saudi Arabia. He was the Mujaddid of 20th-21st century.

Life

Family background
The Maliki family is one of the most respected families in Mecca and has produced great scholars who taught in the Haram of Mecca for centuries. In fact, five of the Sayyid's ancestors have been the Maliki Imams of the Haram of Mecca. Muhammad ibn Alawi al-Maliki was born in Mecca. Due to the well-known nature of their family, they preferred to teach themselves in the Sacred Holy Mosque.

Education
With his father’s instruction, he also studied and mastered the various traditional Islamic sciences of Aqidah, Tafsir, Hadith, Seerah, Fiqh, Usul, Mustalah, Nahw, etc. Scholars of Mecca, as well as Medina, all of whom granted him full Ijazah to teach these sciences to others. Some of the scholars from whom he obtained ijazahs and chains of transmission from include: His father, 'Alawi ibn 'Abbas al-Maliki al-Hasani, al-Habib Ahmad Mashhur Taha al-Haddad, Hasanain Makhlouf, Muhammad al-'Arabi al-Tabbani, Muhammad Hafidh al-Tijani, Amin Kutbi, Mustafa Raza Khan, and numerous others.

Career

Despite criticism of him, al-Maliki retained prominence. In an attempt to counter Wahabism in the early 1990s, the Government of Saudi Arabia began supporting practitioners of Sufism in the Hijaz region as a way to bolster religious support of the state; al-Maliki became the self-imposed leader of Hijazi Sufism under state sponsorship, with several thousand supporters.

Death
He died in 2004 and was buried in Mecca. After his death, Saudi dignitaries made condolence visits to his family. Crown Prince 'Abd Allah (the future king) was quoted as stating that al-Maliki "was faithful both to his religion and country" as one western journalist noted, "the rehabilitation of his legacy was almost complete."

Literary works
Al-Maliki has written on a variety of religious, legal, social and historical topics.

Selected works on various subjects

Aqidah
 Mafahim Yajib an Tusahhah (Conceptions That Need to Be Corrected)
Bidaah Menurut Ulama Salaf
On Celebrating the Birthday of Prophet
 Manhaj al-Salaf fi Fahm al-Nusus
 Al-Tahzir min al-Takfir
 Huwa Allah
 Qul Hazihi Sabeeli
 Sharh ‘Aqidat al-‘Awam

Tafsir
 Zubdat al-Itqan fi ‘Ulum al-Qur’an
 Wa Huwa bi al-Ufuq al-‘A’la
 Al-Qawa‘id al-Asasiyyah fi ‘Ulum al-Quran
 Hawl Khasa’is al-Quran

Hadith
 Al-Manhal al-Latif fi Usul al-Hadith al-Sharif
 Al-Qawa‘id al-Asasiyyah fi ‘Ilm Mustalah al-Hadith Al-Sharif 
 Fadl al-Muwatta wa Inayat al-Ummah al-Islamiyyah bihi
 Anwar al-Masalik fi al-Muqaranah bayn Riwayat al-Muwatta lil-Imam Malik

Seerah
 Muhammad the Best of Creation
 Muhammad al-Insan al-Kamil
Prophet's Night Journey and Heavenly ascent
 ‘Urf al-T ‘arif bi al-Mawlid al-Sharif
 Al-Anwar al-Bahiyyah fi Isra wa M’iraj Khayr al-Bariyyah
 Al-Zakha’ir al-Muhammadiyyah 
 Zikriyat wa Munasabat
 Al-Bushra fi Manaqib al-Sayyidah Khadijah al-Kubra
Prophet in the Barzakh and the Hadith of Isra and Miraj

Fiqh

 Al-Risalah al-Islamiyyah Kamaluha wa Khuluduha wa `Alamiyyatuha 
 Labbayk Allahumma Labbayk 
 Al-Ziyarah al-Nabawiyyah bayn al-Shar`iyyah wa al-Bid`iyyah 
 Shifa' al-Fu'ad bi Ziyarat Khayr al-`Ibad 
 Hawl al-Ihtifal bi Zikra al-Mawlid al-Nabawi al-Sharif
 Al-Madh al-Nabawi bayn al-Ghuluww wa al-Ijhaf

Usul
 Al-Qawa‘id al-Asasiyyah fi Usul al-Fiqh
 Sharh Manzumat al-Waraqat fi Usul al-Fiqh
 Mafhum al-Tatawwur wa al-Tajdid fi al-Shari‘ah al-Islamiyyah

Tasawwuf
 Shawariq al-Anwar min Ad‘iyat al-Sadah al-Akhyar
 Al-Mukhtar min Kalam al-Akhyar
 Al-Husun al-Mani‘ah
 Mukhtasar Shawariq al-Anwar

Miscellaneous
Salawat Quraniyyah
Meluruskan Kesalahpahaman
Dialah Allah
 Fi Rihab al-Bayt al-Haram (History of Mecca)
 Al-Mustashriqun Bayn al-Insaf wa al-‘Asabiyyah (Study of Orientalism)
 Nazrat al-Islam ila al-Riyadah (Sports in Islam)
 Al-Qudwah al-Hasanah fi Manhaj al-Da‘wah ila Allah (Methods of Dawah)
 Ma La ‘Aynun Ra’at (Description of Paradise)
 Nizam al-Usrah fi al-Islam (Islam and Family)
 Al-Muslimun Bayn al-Waqi‘ wa al-Tajribah (Contemporary Muslim world)
 Kashf al-Ghumma (Virtues of helping fellow Muslims)
 Al-Dawah al-Islahiyyah (Call for Reform)
 Fi Sabil al-Huda wa al-Rashad (Collection of speeches)
 Sharaf al-Ummah al-Islamiyyah (Superiority of the Muslim Ummah)
 Usul al-Tarbiyah al-Nabawiyyah (Prophetic methods of education)
 Nur al-Nibras fi Asanid al-Jadd al-Sayyid Abbas (Set of Grandfather’s Ijazahs)
 Al-‘Uqud al-Lu’luiyyah fi al-Asanid al-Alawiyyah (Set of father’s Ijazahs)
 Al-Tali‘ al-Sa‘id al-Muntakhab min al-Musalsalat wa al-Asanid (Set of Ijazahs)
 Al-‘Iqd al-Farid al-Mukhtasar min al-Athbah wa al-Asanid (Set of Ijazahs)

See also
 List of Sufis
 List of Ash'aris and Maturidis
 Sheikh Abubakr Ahmad
 Arab people
 Maliki
 Islam in Saudi Arabia

References

External links
 Extract from “Notions That Must Be Corrected” by Shaykh Muhammad b. Alawi al-Maliki al-Hasani
 Getting to know the Sufis by Stephen Schwartz, The Weekly Standard 
 
 Video of Shaykh Muhammad Ibn 'Alawî Al Mâlikî's funeral
 The Prophets in Barzakh and the Hadith of Isra and Miraj Followed by the Immense Merits of Al-Sham - Online book by Shaikh Muhammad
 The path ahead, Macleans.ca 
 Obituary by Shaykh Seraj Hendricks 
 Obituary by Shafiq Morton 
 Obituary on Islamica Magazine
 A defence of the Ash'ari school by Shaykh Muhammad ibn `Alawi al-Maliki

1944 births
2004 deaths
Asharis
Scholars of Sufism
Saudi Arabian Sufis
Maliki fiqh scholars
Al-Azhar University alumni
People from Mecca
Academic staff of Umm al-Qura University
Banu Idris
Shadhili order
Sunni Muslim scholars of Islam
Sunni imams
Sunni Sufis
20th-century Saudi Arabian people
Burials at Jannat al-Mu'alla
Mujaddid
Muslim reformers